Meir Ba'al HaNes refers to the Tanna Rabbi Meir

It may also refer to a number of charitable organizations named after him:

 Colel Chabad, Ma'ot Eretz Hakodesh
 Kolel Chibas Yerushalayim, Tzidkat Rab Meir Baal Haness
 Kollel Shomrei HaChomos, Tzidkat Rabbi Meir Baal Haness
 Kupath Rabbi Meir Baal Haness, Kolel Polen

Settlement movements in Israel
Jewish charities
Mishnah rabbis
Jews and Judaism in Jerusalem